Seymour Marvin "Cy" Leslie  (December 16, 1922 – January 6, 2008) was an American businessman, the founder of Pickwick Records, and the first president and founder of MGM/UA Home Entertainment Group.  Pickwick Records aimed to make music more affordable, and carried such artists as Elvis Presley at various times.  MGM Home Video was one of the first companies to enter the home video business, which today has become the home entertainment industry including DVD and other sales.  He began his career by founding Voco Records, producing record greeting cards, and later children's records. He was Jewish.

Education  
Leslie received his Bachelor's degree from Syracuse University, before being deployed by the Army in World War II.  Later, he received a business degree from Harvard Business School.  He also received an honorary doctorate from Hofstra University in 1974.

Family 
Leslie married Barbara Miller.  They had three daughters and four grandchildren.

References 
 
 Variety Magazine: MGM's Seymour 'Cy' Leslie dies
 New York Sun: Cy Leslie, 85, Home Video Pioneer
 Songwriters Hall of Fame
 Obituary
 Obituary in The Times, 18 January 2008

1922 births
2008 deaths
20th-century American Jews
20th-century American businesspeople
21st-century American Jews
Harvard Business School alumni
Jewish American military personnel
Mandatory Palestine emigrants to the United States
Syracuse University alumni
United States Army personnel of World War II
American people of Palestinian-Jewish descent